The 1st constituency of Gers is a French legislative constituency in the Gers département.

Deputies

Election results

2022 

 
 
 
 
 
 
 
|-
| colspan="8" bgcolor="#E9E9E9"|
|-

2017

2012

2007

References

 French Interior Ministry results website: 

French legislative constituencies of Gers